Clarence Worme (10 March 1883 – 19 February 1935) was a Barbadian cricketer. He played in one first-class match for the Barbados cricket team in 1899/1900.

See also
 List of Barbadian representative cricketers

References

External links
 

1883 births
1935 deaths
Barbadian cricketers
Barbados cricketers
People from Saint Philip, Barbados